St. Anthony's Basilica in Dornahalli, Karnataka is a Catholic shrine dedicated to St. Anthony of Padua.

Around 200 years ago, a farmer ploughing his field in Dornahalli unearthed a wooden statue of St. Anthony of Padua. the farmer built a small place of worship in honour of the saint. A large church was built at the site in the middle of 19th century and another in 1920. When this church was in a dilapidated condition, it was demolished and rebuilt in 1969. However, the facade from the 1920 church was renovated and retained. This church in the shape of a Tau (English alphabet T) cross and can accommodate a thousand people. It also houses a small relic of St. Anthony brought from Italy. 

Pope Francis granted the title of Minor Basilica to the shrine through a decree dated 17 October 2019.

References

Basilica churches in Karnataka